Ivano Marzola (born 5 October 1963) is an Italian former alpine skier.

Biography
Although Marzola was born in Trieste he is from Val Gardena. He is the brother of the other Italian skier Michaela Marzola.

World Cup results
Top 10

References

External links
 

1963 births
Living people
Italian male alpine skiers
Sportspeople from Südtirol
People from Sëlva